The 2022 UCLA Bruins baseball team represented the University of California, Los Angeles during the 2022 NCAA Division I baseball season. The Bruins played their home games at Jackie Robinson Stadium as a member of the Pac-12 Conference. They were led by head coach John Savage, in his 18th season at UCLA.

Previous season

The Bruins finished with a record of 37–20, and 18–12 in conference play. In the postseason, the Bruins were invited and participated in the 2021 NCAA Division I baseball tournament, where they lost to North Carolina and the #8 national seed Texas Tech in the Lubbock Regional in Lubbock, Texas.

Preseason
Long time assistant coach Rex Peters has retired after 29 years of coaching baseball, with the last 10 years at UCLA. To fill the vacancy on John Savage's staff, Niko Gallego was promoted from volunteer assistant coach to assistant and former UCLA pitcher David Berg took over as volunteer assistant coach. Berg played an important part as a member of the Bruins' 2013 College World Series championship team.

Personnel

Roster

Coaches

Schedule

|-
! style=""| Regular Season: 35–20 (Home: 22–9; Away: 11–10; Neutral: 2–1)
|- valign="top" 
|

|- 
|

|- 
|

|- 
|

|-
! style=""| Postseason: 5–4 (Home: 0–0; Away: 0–0; Neutral: 5–4)
|- valign="top" 
|

|- 
|

|- style="text-align:center;"
|   

|}

Source:

Rankings

References

External links 
 UCLA Bruins baseball

UCLA Bruins
UCLA Bruins baseball seasons
UCLA Bruins baseball
UCLA